Katwa Assembly constituency is an assembly constituency in Purba Bardhaman district in the Indian state of West Bengal.

Overview
As per orders of the Delimitation Commission, No. 270 Katwa assembly constituency covers Katwa municipality, Dainhat municipality, Katwa II community development block and Khajurdihi, Sudpur, Karajgram and Goai gram panchayats of Katwa I CD Block.

Katwa assembly segment was earlier part of Katwa (Lok Sabha constituency). As per orders of Delimitation Commission it is part of No. 38 Bardhaman Purba (Lok Sabha constituency).

Members of Legislative Assembly

Election results

2021

2016

2011

1977-2006
Rabindranath Chatterjee of Congress won the Katwa assembly seat in 2006, 2001, 1996 defeating his nearest rivals, Sudipta Bagchi, Kanak Kanti Goswami and Anjan Chatterjee, all of CPI(M) in the respective years. Contests in most years were multi cornered but only winners and runners are being mentioned. Anjan Chatterjee of CPI(M) won the seat in 1991 and 1987 defeating Rabindranath Chatterjee of Congress. Haramohan Sinha of CPI(M) won the seat in 1982 and 1977 defeating Subrata Mukherjee of Congress and Nityananda Thakur of Janata Party in the respective years.

1951-1972
Subrata Mukherjee of Congress won the Katwa assembly seat in 1972. Haramohan Sinha of CPI (M) won it in 1971. Nityananda Thakur of Congress won it in 1969. Subodh Chowdhury of CPI (M) won it in 1967. Subodh Chowdhury, representing CPI, won the seat in 1962. Tarapada Cahudhuri of Congress won it in 1957. Subodh Chowdhury, representing CPI, won the seat in 1951.

References

Assembly constituencies of West Bengal
Politics of Purba Bardhaman district